is a Japanese shōnen manga series created by Jin Kusude and collaboration with Mitsuhisa Tamura, based on the Pokémon franchise by Nintendo and Game Freak. The manga was first serialized in Shogakukan's Weekly Shōnen Sunday magazine on March 9, 2011, and ended on October 10, 2012, compiled into eight volumes. The manga departs from the original series, with having a more serious storyline and the characters to become fighting Pokémon gijinkas using an ability called Burst.

Plot
The manga follows the story of Ryouga, Miruto and Yappy as they all search for the mysterious figure known as "Arcades". Only Arcades knows where Ryouga's missing father is and will tell him his location if Ryouga is strong enough to face him. Along their journey, they must also stop the evil Great Gavel Organization from taking over the world.

Characters

Main characters

Ryouga is the main character of the manga series. He is a kind of person who hates the words "impossible" or "no good" and will freak out and set to prove who or whatever had spoken those words wrong. Ryouga's Burst form allows him to merge with Zekrom, gaining him the ability to use both Dragon and Electric-type powers. As a normal human, Ryouga has immense physical strength, but with the power of Burst, his strength is augmented greatly.

Ryouga's best friend, Murito can be usually be seen lecturing Ryouga whenever he tries to do something stupid. She can also be crafty as seen when she used the forbidden words on Ryouga to get him to reveal her about Burst when he initially wouldn't tell her. Miruto constantly carries a small notebook with her to jot down the various things she learns on her travels.

A Freelance Journalist, Yappy is also one of Ryouga's friends who wishes to become the world's top journalist and believes that everything he has to undergo is just a trial he has to go through to become one. He is quite cowardly and extremely untrustworthy as shown when he quickly attempts to betray Ryouga and Miruto after he starts traveling with them. At first, Ryouga and Miruto thinks he's a Pansage, but in reality he is a human being. (In fact, Yappy has a Pansage-inspired hairstyle which may confuses somebody thinks he's a Pansage.)

Great Gavel
A villainous organization in the manga series. The members of Great Gavel are usually using weapons instead of Pokémon to terrorize the populace of wherever they attack but members who have a Pokémon have used them solely for the Burst technique. The notable members of this group are:

The leader of Great Gavel who is shrouded in mystery. He made himself younger using Great Gavel's technological advancements. He was also a contestant in Burst Heart Survival, but eventually losing to Ryouga in the final match. He is currently in Great Gavel headquarters. Originally have Bisharp and Reshiram he can use them as a Burst form, he now has more Pokémon he can use as Burst forms such as Samurott, Golurk and Zebstrika without the use of Burst Heart, after gaining Arcades' power.

A member of the Great Gavel and an Excadrill Burst Warrior. He has a sort of crazed personality, and is the first member to attack Ryouga and his friends, but has been end up beaten back.

A member of the Great Gavel and a Carracosta Burst Warrior. He seems to have a timid personality, and prefers to fight dirty until the opponents become far too weak to fight.

A commander of Great Gavel who uses his weapon to steal the lifeforce of a fire-type Pokémon. He first used the weapon to attack Ryouga and his friends, but has been end up attacked by Ryouga's Burst form.

The Three Generals
 are three high-ranking members of Great Gavel, even higher than the Seven Warriors. Each are Burst Warriors equipped with the Bursts of the legendary musketeers. The members of this are:

One of the Three Generals of the Great Gavel Organization, who uses a Cobalion for his Burst Form. Amu is a young member of Great Gavel, and despite his size and playful personality, he is apparently strong enough to be a member of the Three Generals. As a teenager, he is very energetic, and is constantly seen running around, annoying his older teammates by teasing them.

One of the Three Generals of the Great Gavel Organization, who uses a Terrakion for his Burst Form.

One of the Three Generals of the Great Gavel Organization, who uses a Virizion for her Burst Form.

Former members

The well-known member of Great Gavel. He is the first rival to Ryouga, and also an entrant into Burst Heart Survival. He somewhat frequently fights Ryouga at their first meeting, but upon in the Burst Heart Survival tournament, he joins the group for a short time before leaving. Despite his fixation on having revenge, he still cares about his friend Carola and shares an almost brother-sisterly bond with her. Hariru has a Zorua, now evolved into Zoroark, in which he can use it as his Burst form.

Carola is a former member of the Great Gavel Organization and one of the Seven Warriors, who uses an Emboar for her Burst form.Carola is a young character who despite being a child, is a member of a criminal organization. She has a voracious appetite which is later explained that she needs to eat in order to replace any lost calories from using her Burst. While she acts innocent most of the time, Carola can easily switch to a dark and sinister personality when the moment calls for it. Despite all of this, Carola secretly wishes to leave Great Gavel with Hariru because she hates how they treat Pokémon and people. Carola cares deeply for Hariru and shares an almost sister-brotherly bond with him. It is revealed that in the past she and Hariru were taken into Great Gavel by their boss after losing their family and friends to the organization.

Other characters

A man who is an old friend of Garyuu (Ryouga's father). He had trained Ryouga in gaining better control over his Burst, and had revealed that he and Garyuu had fought Great Gavel in the past. His Burst form is a Boldore.

The navigator of the Burst Heart Survival tournament.

A young ninja from a village who later joins Ryouga's group after Burst Heart Survival. His home village was plagued by an unknown disease. He was first appeared as a contestant in Burst Heart Survival, but losing in a round and joins the group after the tournament ends. After traveling with Ryouga and his friends, Karuta gains confidence in himself and rapidly grows in body and mind, and now stands taller than Ryouga. Karuta has an Accelgor which he can use as a Burst form.

A wandering bandit notable for her manipulative personality. She is more than willing to use others to accomplish her own goals, but will also directly work to get what she wants, including by using the capabilities of her Burst form, Purrloin. After Ryouga returned the Purrloin Burst heart to her, it has been hinted that she may be developing feelings for him, as she goes on to get closer to Ryouga and discuss about him with Miruto.

Terminology

Burst
 is a special technique that allows a human to combine with a Pokémon, gaining its powers and immunities while increasing the user's physical and defensive strengths. It is stated that in order to use Burst, one must go through rigorous training or else their life will be in danger if they attempt it. If one is defeated while in Burst form, they will automatically change back to normal.

Burst Heart
A  is a small, pocket sized jewel that actually holds a Pokémon inside of it, sealed so that its power can be used by anyone wishing to fuse with it. The Burst Heart can be compared to a Poké Ball in that it holds a Pokémon inside, but is also different due to the fact that it doesn't store a Pokémon to be released for later use. If a Burst Heart is broken, the Pokémon inside will be freed. It is not known how a Burst Heart is made, but  have been created by Great Gavel.

Once Burst is activated, the user will have their physical traits increased greatly. Whatever abilities the user will get depends on the type of Pokémon used to combine; for example, a Ground-type Pokémon will make the user immune to Electric attacks. It is stated that in order to use Burst, one must go through rigorous training or else their life will be in danger if they attempt it.

It is shown that a person can actually be sent inside of their Burst Heart in order to better connect with the Pokémon inside. In Ryouga's Burst Heart, an entire field can be seen inside and a large area where his Zekrom is being held. Once he arrives to this spot, a key takes the form of a young gatekeeper boy to test him and see if he's worthy enough of seeing Zekrom. Once Ryouga passes the test, the boy turns back into his true form—a key—and allows him to see Zekrom.

It is later revealed that a Burst Heart—like the Pokémon they contain—can become stronger as they get involved in more battles. This allows the Burst itself to become stronger at the same time as the Burst Warrior.

Compass of Light
The  is a large crystal-like object that has the ability to search out Burst Hearts. Once a Burst Heart is put inside one of its six grooves, it will emit a beam of light that will seek out any other Burst Heart in the vicinity. The more Burst Hearts that are nearby, the more beams of light will seek them out. Also, the thicker the beam is, the stronger the person that possesses the Burst Heart is. According to Hariru, if the "six original Burst Hearts" are put inside of the grooves, Ryouga will be able to find the person he has been searching for, Arcades.

Burst Heart Survival
 is a tournament for Burst Warriors in the Pokémon RéBURST manga. It is hosted by Pauline, the navigator. The winner gets a prize of ¥1,000,000,000 and all of the other contestant's Burst Hearts.

References

Manga series
2011 manga
Pokémon manga
Shogakukan manga
Shōnen manga